Moondooner is a rural locality in the South Burnett Region, Queensland, Australia.

Geography 
The land use is grazing on native vegetation with some crop growing.

History

Education 
There are no schools in Moondooner. The nearest government primary schools are Murgon State School in neighbouring Murgon to the west and Moffatdale State School in Moffatdale to the south. The nearest government secondary schools are Murgon State High School (to Year 12) in Murgon and Goomeri State School (to Year 10) in neighbouring Goomeri to the north-west.

References 

South Burnett Region
Localities in Queensland